Grewingk Glacier is a 13-mile-long (21 km) glacier located in the Kenai Mountains, near Kachemak Bay, in the U.S. state of Alaska.

It was named in 1880 by W. H. Dall of the U.S. Coast and Geodetic Survey for the Baltic German geologist Constantin Grewingk.

References

See also
 List of glaciers

Glaciers of Alaska
Glaciers of Kenai Peninsula Borough, Alaska